Anders Ploug Boesen (born 6 March 1976) is a former professional badminton player from Denmark. He has represented Denmark in international tournaments such as in World Championships, Sudirman Cup, Thomas Cup and European Championships.

Anders Boesen completed his medical studies in 2006, and later finished his surgical training subspecialized in arthroscopic surgery and sports traumatology at Department of Orthopedic Surgery, Copenhagen University Hospital, Amager-Hvidovre, in 2017. He now works as a sports doctor in F.C. Copenhagen together with his brother Morten Boesen who is also a Danish former badminton player.

Achievements

World Senior Championships

European Championships 
Men's singles

IBF World Grand Prix 
The World Badminton Grand Prix sanctioned by International Badminton Federation (IBF) from 1983 to 2006.

Men's singles

IBF International 
Men's singles

References

External links 

1976 births
Living people
Sportspeople from Copenhagen
Danish male badminton players
Danish surgeons
F.C. Copenhagen non-playing staff